The Hall XFH was an American fighter aircraft built by the Hall Aluminum Company. It was the first fighter with a semi-monocoque metal fuselage.

Development
The XFH was designed in 1927 by Charles Hall. It was a single-bay biplane with N-struts for the fabric-covered wings. Its fuselage was made of steel tubing covered with a watertight aluminum skin, enabling it to float if ditched in the ocean. Also for ditching on water or on land, the landing gear could be jettisoned. Power was provided by a Pratt & Whitney Wasp radial engine. Testing in June 1929 showed poor handling characteristics and performance. During one test flight, the upper wing separated from the aircraft. After repairs, the XFH made test flights from an aircraft carrier. Designated XFH by the Bureau of Aeronautics, it was purchased not for active service, but to study new metal construction techniques.

Specifications

References

Citations

Bibliography

F01H
1920s United States fighter aircraft
Single-engined tractor aircraft
Biplanes